DOK or Dok may refer to:

 Danube–Oder Canal, a planned and partially constructed artificial waterway in eastern Europe
 Dok Leipzig, a documentary festival in Leipzig, Germany
 DOK (TV series), a Swiss documentary television series
 Donetsk International Airport
 Dok, an ancient fortification on the Mount of Temptation near Jericho
 John "Dok" Hager (1858-1932), cartoonist
 DOK Supermercato, an Italian supermarket